Karasha is a rural locality (a selo) and the administrative centre of Karashinsky Selsoviet, Laksky District, Republic of Dagestan, Russia. The population was 167 as of 2010. There are 3 streets.

Geography 
Karasha is located 12 km northeast of Kumukh (the district's administrative centre) by road. Unchukatl and Kamasha are the nearest rural localities.

Nationalities 
Laks live there.

References 

Rural localities in Laksky District